Kai-Uwe von Hassel (21 April 1913 – 8 May 1997) was a German politician from Schleswig-Holstein associated with the Christian Democratic Union (CDU). He served as Minister President of Schleswig-Holstein from 1954 to 1963, as Federal Minister of Defence from 1963 to 1966, and as Federal Minister for Displaced Persons, Refugees and War Victims from 1966 to 1969. From 1969 to 1972 he was the 4th President of the Bundestag.

Life and career
Hassel was born in Gare, German East Africa (now in Lushoto, Tanga Region, Tanzania), where his father Theodor von Hassel (1868–1935) had served as a Schutztruppe officer. After the First World War, the Hassel family was banished from Tanganyika by the British mandate administration and settled in Glücksburg, Schleswig-Holstein. Hassel took his Abitur school-leaving exam in 1933, trained as an agribusiness merchant, and returned to the Tanganyika Territory in 1935. At the beginning of the Second World War he was interned in Dar es Salaam by the British authorities and was again banished to Germany. Drafted into the Wehrmacht armed forces, he served as an interpreter for the Abwehr military intelligence organisation under Admiral Wilhelm Canaris and was decorated with the Iron Cross (2nd Class).

After the war, Hassel joined the newly established Christian Democrat party in the Flensburg district and from 1947 served as mayor of Glücksburg. In 1950 he became a member of the Schleswig-Holstein legislature, and at the 1953 federal election a member of the German Bundestag.

On 11 October 1954 Hassel assumed the office of a Minister-President of Schleswig-Holstein. From 1955–1956, he was President of the German Bundesrat. He was closely associated with Ludwig Erhard's two Chancellorships, serving as Minister of Defense from 9 January 1963 to 1 December 1966. In 1963 he secretly asked the United States to supply the Bundeswehr with chemical weapons. He then served in Kurt Georg Kiesinger's cabinet from 1 December 1966 to 21 October 1969 as Minister of Displaced Persons, Refugees, and War Victims. His son Joachim von Hassel, a naval aviator and Oberleutnant zur See, was killed in a Lockheed F-104 Starfighter crash on 10 March 1970.

Following his service in the government, Hassel was president of the Bundestag from 5 February 1969 to 13 December 1972, having been elected when the previous president, Eugen Gerstenmaier, resigned during a financial scandal. He died aged 84, when he suffered a heart attack during the Charlemagne Award ceremony in the Aachen city hall in 1997.

References

Sources
 Michael F. Feldkamp (ed.), Der Bundestagspräsident. Amt – Funktion – Person. 16. Wahlperiode, München 2007,

External links 

 Entry at the Federal Ministry of Defence website
 Von Hassels Afrika Korps in Tanzania

1913 births
1997 deaths
Colonial people of German East Africa
Tanzanian people of German descent
People from Lushoto District
Presidents of the German Bundesrat
Christian Democratic Union of Germany politicians
Members of the Landtag of Schleswig-Holstein
People of former German colonies
Grand Crosses 1st class of the Order of Merit of the Federal Republic of Germany
Defence ministers of Germany
Presidents of the Bundestag
Ministers-President of Schleswig-Holstein
German military personnel of World War II
Members of the Bundestag 1976–1980
Members of the Bundestag 1972–1976
Members of the Bundestag 1969–1972
Members of the Bundestag 1965–1969
Members of the Bundestag 1953–1957
MEPs for Germany 1979–1984
Members of the European Parliament for Germany